Taksyrovo (Taqhır) is a rural locality (a village) in Gusevsky Selsoviet, Abzelilovsky District, Bashkortostan, Russia. The population was 398 as of 2010. There are 3 streets.

Geography 
Taksyrovo is located 27 km southeast of Askarovo (the district's administrative centre) by road. Gusevo is the nearest rural locality.

References 

Rural localities in Abzelilovsky District